Transition metal dithiophosphate complexes are coordination compounds containing dithiophosphate ligands, i.e. ligands of the formula (RO)2PS.  The homoleptic complexes have formulas M[S2P(OR)2]2 and M[S2P(OR)2]3.  These neutral complexes tend to be soluble in organic solvents, especially when R is branched.

Perhaps the most important members are zinc dialkyldithiophosphates, which are oil additives. Such compounds are prepared by the reaction of dialkoxydithiophoric acid with metal oxides, chlorides, and acetates.

References

Phosphorothioates